Events from the year 1959 in Belgium

Incumbents
Monarch: Baudouin
Prime Minister: Gaston Eyskens

Events
 2 July – Marriage of Prince Albert and Donna Paola Ruffo di Calabria in the Cathedral of St. Michael and St. Gudula, Brussels

Publications
 Commercial information relative to the principal products of the Belgian Congo and Ruanda-Urundi (Brussels, Office de l'information et des relations publiques pour le Congo belge et le Ruanda-Urundi)

Births

 August 7 – Koenraad Elst, Belgian Indologist

Deaths
 9 February – Nand Geersens (born 1895), broadcaster

References

 
Belgium
Years of the 20th century in Belgium
1950s in Belgium
Belgium